Harpochloa falx, caterpillar grass, is a species of flowering plant in the family Poaceae, native to all of South Africa, Lesotho, and Eswatini. Although fire-adapted, in the absence of regular burns it comes to dominate its competitors.

References

Chloridoideae
Flora of the Cape Provinces
Flora of the Free State
Flora of KwaZulu-Natal
Flora of the Northern Provinces
Flora of Swaziland
Flora of Lesotho
Plants described in 1891